Rwanda competed at the 2019 World Championships in Athletics in Doha, Qatar from 27 September to 6 October 2019.

Results

Men

Track and road events

Women

Track and road events

References

Rwanda
World Championships in Athletics
2019